Karé Adenegan (born 29 December 2000) is a British wheelchair athlete specialising in sprint distances in the T34 classification. She was classified as a disability athlete in 2013.

Competing for Great Britain at the 2016 Summer Paralympics, at the age of 15, she won a silver medal and two bronze medals. In 2018, Adenegan set a then New World record in the T34 100m at the Müller Anniversary Games in London, with a time of 16.80 seconds. Adenegan is one of the only T34 athletes to have completed the 100 metres in sub 17 seconds

Adenegan is also the only athlete to have defeated Hannah Cockroft in a T34 Women's wheelchair race. (Once in 2015 aged 14yrs and twice in 2018 aged 17 yrs old).

In 2018, she won the BBC Young Sports Personality of the Year Award.

Early years
Adenegan was born in 2000 in Coventry, England and attended Bablake School. She now attends Warwick University. She has cerebral palsy.

Athletics career
Adenegan took up wheelchair racing in 2012, after being inspired by the Summer Paralympics in London. At school she found herself excluded from sports due to her cerebral palsy, but the Games made her realize that sport was open to her. That year she joined a wheelchair academy in Coventry, and after becoming classified as a T34 athlete she began competing at national meets in 2013.

In September 2015 Adenegan managed a major sporting coup when at the Grand Prix final in London she became the first athlete to beat world record holder Hannah Cockroft in more than seven years. The two team-mates met again a month later when Adenegan as selected as the youngest member of the Great Britain team at the 2015 IPC Athletics World Championships in Doha. There she entered three events, the 100 metres, 400 metres and 800 metres, all in the T34 classification. Although just missing out on the 100m podium, after finishing fourth, Adenegan won her first major international medals of her career with bronze positions in both the 400m and 800m events. Both events were won by Cockroft.

Although she qualified for the 2016 IPC Athletics European Championships in Grosseto, Adenegan pulled out of the event to concentrate on her preparations for the 2016 Summer Paralympics in Rio de Janeiro. When the final Great Britain athletics squad was announced, Adenegan was elected for three events and was the youngest team member in the track and field squad.

In 2018 aged 17, Adenegan broke the T34, women's 100 metres world record at the London Muller Anniversary Diamond League defeating Hannah Cockroft by half a second. Adenegan's placed a time of 16:80 seconds making her the only T34 athlete to have gone under 17 seconds in the history of the sport.

In August 2018, at the Para World  European Athletics Championships in Berlin, Adenegan defeated Cockroft in the T34 100 metres for the second time in the season, also setting a championship record of 17:34 seconds ( Cockroft finished in 17:95 seconds). Adenegan got her first gold medal in senior competition and a silver in the 800 metres in the same competition.

In June 2021 she was among the first dozen athletes chosen to represent the UK at the postponed 2020 Paralympics in Tokyo, where she won silver medals in the 100 metres and 800 metre competitions.

Personal life
Adenegan is a Christian. She is a member of the Christians in Sport organisation.

References

External links 
 
 
 

2000 births
Living people
English female wheelchair racers
Paralympic athletes of Great Britain
Paralympic silver medalists for Great Britain
Paralympic bronze medalists for Great Britain
Paralympic medalists in athletics (track and field)
Athletes (track and field) at the 2016 Summer Paralympics
Athletes (track and field) at the 2020 Summer Paralympics
Medalists at the 2016 Summer Paralympics
Medalists at the 2020 Summer Paralympics
Track and field athletes with cerebral palsy
Sportspeople from Coventry
People educated at Bablake School
Alumni of the University of Warwick
21st-century English women
English Christians